The 2018–19 Loyola Greyhounds men's basketball team represented Loyola University Maryland during the 2018–19 NCAA Division I men's basketball season. The Greyhounds, led by first-year head coach Tavaras Hardy, played their home games at Reitz Arena in Baltimore, Maryland as members of the Patriot League. They finished the season 11–21, 7–11 in Patriot League play to finish in a tie for seventh place. As the No. 9 seed in the Patriot League tournament, they lost Boston University in the first round.

Previous season
The Greyhounds finished the 2017–18 season 9–22, 6–12 in Patriot League play to finish in a tie for eighth place. They defeated Army in the first round of the Patriot League tournament before losing in the quarterfinals to Bucknell.

On March 8, 2018, the school announced G. G. Smith had resigned as head coach. He finished at Loyola with a five-year record of 56–98. On March 28, the Greyhounds hired Georgia Tech assistant coach Tavaras Hardy for the head coaching job.

Offseason

Departures

2018 recruiting class

2019 recruiting class

Roster

Schedule and results

|-
!colspan=9 style=| Exhibition

|-
!colspan=9 style=| Non-conference regular season

|-
!colspan=9 style=| Patriot League regular season

|-
!colspan=9 style=| Patriot League tournament

References

Loyola Greyhounds men's basketball seasons
Loyola